Reel to Real is the seventh and final album by the American rock band Love, released in 1974.

Background
Reel to Real was the first official Love album in four years, and bandleader Arthur Lee recorded the album with studio musicians after dismissing all previous band members. It follows the release of Lee's solo album Vindicator in 1972 and two different Love albums that had been recorded but never released.

Reel to Real featured the same musicians that played on the unreleased Black Beauty and was originally intended as part of a two-album deal with Robert Stigwood's RSO Records. A long-time admirer of Arthur Lee, Skip Taylor, approached the label and convinced Stigwood to give the previously commercially unsuccessful Lee the largest advance he would ever receive, followed by the biggest touring opportunity any incarnation of Love would ever embark on, opening for acts such as Lou Reed and Eric Clapton. The tour was a disaster due to Lee's increasingly erratic behavior.

The album was reissued by High Moon Records with new liner notes, archival photos and bonus tracks on CD and digital in 2015 and LP in 2016.

Critical reception

The 2015 reissue on High Moon Records received mostly positive reviews:

UNCUT: 8/10 "...a rich, varied and soulful album that captures an exuberant Lee on an all too-infrequent upswing".

PopDose: "A vitally important band – and performer like Arthur Lee – needs to be held in the light for their amazing catalog."

All Music: "An album with more than its share of great moments."

Writing about the 2015 reissue for Exclaim!, Daniel Sylvester noted that Lee "comes off sounding nothing short of subdued, toothless and aimless," adding that the record "is lovingly assembled and digitally enhanced, but nonetheless, shouldn't be mistaken for an essential release."

Track listing
All tracks written and arranged by Arthur Lee, except where noted.Side 1

1. Time Is Like a River

2. Stop the Music

3. Who Are You

4. Good Old Fashion Dream

5. Which Witch Is Which?

6. With a Little Energy

Side 2

7. Singing Cowboy (Lee, Jay Donnellan)

8. Be Thankful for What You Got (William DeVaughn)

9. You Said You Would

10. Busted Feet (Lee, Charles Karp)

11. Everybody's Gotta Live

Deluxe Edition Bonus Tracks

12. Do It Yourself [Outtake]

13. I Gotta Remember [Outtake]

14. Somebody [Outtake]

15. You Gotta Feel It [Outtake]

16. With A Little Energy [Alternate Mix]

17. Busted Feet [Alternate Mix]

18. You Said You Would [Single Mix]

19. Stop The Music [Alternate Take]

20. Graveyard Hop [Studio Rehearsal]

21. Singing Cowboy [Alternate Take]

22. Everybody’s Gotta Live [Electric Version]

23. Wonder People (I Do Wonder) [Studio Rehearsal]

Personnel
 Arthur Lee - rhythm guitar, acoustic guitar, vocal

Additional personnel
 Melvan Whittington - guitar
 John Sterling - guitar
 Sherwood Akuna - bass
 Joe Blocker - drums
 Bobby Lyle - keyboards
 Gary Bell - synthesizer
 Herman McCormick - conductor
 Wilber Brown, Fred Carter, John Clauder, Alan DeVille, Clifford Solomon and Billy Sprague - horns
 Venetta Fields, Jessica Smith and Carlina Williams - vocals
 Robert Rozelle - bass (6, 7, 10)
 Buzzy Feiten - lead guitar (3)
 Art Fox - acoustic guitar (5)
 Harvey "The Snake" Mandel - electric guitars (5)
 Joe Deaguro - vocal, vibes (8)

References

1975 albums
Love (band) albums
Albums produced by Arthur Lee (musician)
RSO Records albums